Gideon Adlon (born ) is an American actress. She is best known for her starring roles in the comedy film Blockers (2018), the drama film The Mustang (2019), and the horror film The Craft: Legacy (2020). Adlon also starred in the Netflix drama series The Society (2019). She is also known for playing Violet in the video game The Walking Dead: The Final Season (2018).

Early life and education
Adlon was born in Los Angeles and holds both American and German citizenship through her father. She is the oldest daughter of actress Pamela Adlon and director Felix O. Adlon. Her younger sisters are actress Odessa A'zion and Valentine "Rocky" Adlon. Her paternal grandfather is German filmmaker Percy Adlon and her maternal grandfather was American writer-producer Don Segall. Her maternal grandfather was born to a Jewish family, and her English-born maternal grandmother, originally an Anglican, converted to Judaism. Through her father, she descends from the German hotelier Lorenz Adlon.

Adlon studied Photography at Columbia College Chicago for a year before deciding to pursue acting full-time.

Career
Adlon made her professional acting debut in a 2011 episode of the FX comedy-drama series Louie, which also featured her mother Pamela. She went on to make guest appearances in the Disney Channel sitcom Girl Meets World (2016), the FX comedy-drama series Better Things (2016), the ABC miniseries When We Rise (2017), the CBS crime drama series Criminal Minds (2017), and the ABC anthology crime drama series American Crime (2017).

Adlon received further recognition for her first starring role in the sex comedy film Blockers (2018), which received positive reviews and box office success. She went on to star in the critically acclaimed drama film The Mustang (2019). Also in 2019, Adlon had a starring role as Becca Gelb in the Netflix mystery teen drama series The Society. The series was originally renewed for a second season, but was later canceled as a result of the COVID-19 pandemic causing cost increases and difficulty scheduling production.

Adlon starred as Frankie in the horror sequel film The Craft: Legacy, which was released on October 28, 2020. In 2021 she starred as Claire in the horror fantasy film Witch Hunt.

Filmography

Film

Television

Video games
 The Walking Dead: The Final Season (2018–2019), as Violet (voice role)

References

External links
 
 

1997 births
Living people
21st-century American actresses
Actresses from Los Angeles
Gideon
American child actresses
American film actresses
American television actresses
American people of English descent
American people of German descent
American people of Russian-Jewish descent
American people of Ukrainian-Jewish descent
Citizens of Germany through descent
Jewish American actresses
21st-century American Jews